Adolf Schwarte (born 28 January 1935) is a German middle-distance runner. He competed in the men's 1500 metres at the 1960 Summer Olympics.

References

1935 births
Living people
Athletes (track and field) at the 1960 Summer Olympics
German male middle-distance runners
Olympic athletes of the United Team of Germany
Place of birth missing (living people)